The Team Mini-Max Hi-MAX is a single-seat, high wing, strut-braced, single engine aircraft available in kit form for amateur construction. It first flew in 1987 and is a high wing development of the Mini-MAX, hence its model name.

The Hi-MAX was originally produced by TEAM Incorporated of Bradyville, Tennessee. After that company was bankrupted by a lawsuit production passed to Ison Aircraft also of Bradyville, Tennessee and next to JDT Mini-MAX of Nappanee, Indiana. The company was renamed Team Mini-Max in 2012 and moved to Niles, Michigan.

Development
The Hi-MAX was developed from the mid-winged Mini-MAX family of single seat kit aircraft and it shares many similar features with the earlier design.

The Hi-MAX is predominantly constructed from wood truss with plywood gussets and covered with doped aircraft fabric. The windshield is Lexan and the side windows are removable for warm weather operations. The aircraft features a short-span wing of only  and a fiberglass engine cowling. The wing and horizontal stabilizer are both strut-braced, the tail with struts above the horizontal tail surface to the fin.

The aircraft has conventional landing gear, with wheel pants as an option. The company claims that a builder can complete the aircraft in 350–400 hours from the kit.

The aircraft was originally intended to meet the requirements of the US FAR 103 Ultralight Vehicles category, including that category's maximum  empty weight. It was only able to achieve that low empty weight with the  Rotax 277, which provided marginal performance. The standard specified engine today is the  Rotax 447 which results in a  empty weight and places the aircraft in the US Experimental - Amateur-built category.

Variants

1400Z
Single seat aircraft with the  Zenoah G-50 engine. Optional engine was the  Rotax 277.  First flight 1991, no longer in production.
1700R
Single seat aircraft with the  Rotax 447 engine. First flight 1987, remains in production, with 250 completed and flown by 2011.

Specifications (1700Z)

See also

References

External links

1980s United States ultralight aircraft
Single-engined tractor aircraft
High-wing aircraft
Aircraft first flown in 1987